Pointe-aux-Chênes ("Oak Point") is an unincorporated community located in Terrebonne Parish, Louisiana, United States. 
In Cajun French, the area is known as Pointe-aux-Chenes ("Oak Point").  The community shares a zip code with Montegut (70377) and has many residents of Chitimacha descent. In 1993, they established the independent Pointe-au-Chien Indian Tribe, which is one of three state-recognized Houma tribes.

History
Pointe-aux-Chenes is home to many members of the Pointe-au-Chien Tribe, which is state recognized Indian tribe but not federally recognized. The Pointe-au-Chien tribe was formed in 1993 as a breakaway group from the United Houma Nation. Tribal members consider themselves related to the Chitimacha, Choctaw, Acolapissa, and Atakapa.

Since the 1970s, tribal members have become increasingly involved in environmental preservation, as industrialization and dredging by shipping and oil companies have caused extensive damage to coastal wetlands and loss of property. The oil company dredged elsewhere, but the results were still catastrophic. Tribe members say the deep cuts made through the marshes brought in saltwater and led to coastal erosion of the wetlands. That erosion has turned the once abundant oak trees in Pointe-aux-Chenes, which means "Oak Point" in French, into empty husks. Erosion has also turned areas where people once lived into waterlogged marshes or open water.

Geography
Houses in Pointe-aux-Chenes are built on stilts to accommodate seasonal and storm flooding.

Demographics
Some members of the 680 strong Pointe-au-Chien Indian Tribe live in the community.

Education
Terrebonne Parish School District operates public schools. Point-aux-Chenes Elementary School is in the community.

References

External links

 Pointe-aux-Chenes Elementary School - Terrebonne Parish School District

Unincorporated communities in Terrebonne Parish, Louisiana
Unincorporated communities in Houma – Thibodaux metropolitan area
Unincorporated communities in Louisiana